James Philip Wright (born 13 June 1986 in Stockport, Greater Manchester), is a speedway rider in the United Kingdom.

Career history 

He started his career with the Buxton Hitmen before progressing to Belle Vue Aces in 2003. Also in 2004 he became the Conference League Riders' Champion as a Workington Comets rider. He stayed with Workington and Belle Vue for several years.

In June 2007, Wright signed for Vastervik to ride in the Swedish Elite League and he represented Great Britain for the 2007 Under 21-World Cup Final. Also in 2007, Wright become Premier League Riders Champion. 

In November 2007, Wright announced he had signed a two-year deal to ride for Unia Tarnów in the Polish Liga I, along with his Belle Vue team mates Steve Boxall and Patrick Hougaard. The Swindon Robins announced that Wright would ride for them in 2008 in the Elite League. After Swindon couldn't fit James into their 2009 team he was returned to Belle Vue to continue his career in the Elite League for 2009 and 2010.

Wright was consistently scoring well and averaged 8.14 for Workington in 2011 before joining Somerset Rebels for the remainder of 2011 and the 2012 Premier League speedway season. He spent 2013 at Glasgow and reached his fifth British final during the same year. After the 2014 and 2015 seasons with Plymouth he left speedway for five years before making a surprise return for the 2021 season. He spent the 2021 season with Newcastle and Sheffield.

In 2022, he rode for the Scunthorpe Scorpions in the SGB Championship 2022. In 2023, he signed for Birmingham Brummies for the SGB Championship 2023, eleven years after first appearing for the club back in 2011.

Family
His grandfather, Jim Yacoby rode for the Belle Vue Aces from 1959 until 1967. James' brother Charles is also a speedway rider.

Honours 
Team U-21 World Championship:
2007 –  Abensberg – Silver medal (6 points)

References 

1986 births
Living people
British speedway riders
English motorcycle racers
Sportspeople from Stockport
Belle Vue Aces riders
Birmingham Brummies riders
Buxton Hitmen riders
Glasgow Tigers riders
Newcastle Diamonds riders
Scunthorpe Scorpions riders
Sheffield Tigers riders
Somerset Rebels riders
Swindon Robins riders
Workington Comets riders